The Australian women's national baseball team, nicknamed the Emeralds, represents Australia in international women's baseball tournaments and competitions. The team is controlled by the Australian Baseball Federation, which is represented in the Baseball Confederation of Oceania (BCO). They are the only team in Oceania to be formally ranked by the International Baseball Federation (IBAF), and are the 3rd ranked women's baseball team in the world. The Emeralds have been in existence since 2001, when the first ever squad was selected from the 2001 National Women’s Championships, held in Sydney. They compete in the biennial IBAF Women’s Baseball World Cup.

The team has competed at all eight Women's Baseball World Cups, most recently finishing seventh in 2018. The next major tournament will be the 2020 Women's Baseball World Cup.

Roster

2020 World Cup Roster 
No Roster was named due to postponement of the World Cup due to the COVID pandemic.
The World Cup was originally scheduled for Monterey Mexico, and then changed to Tijuana Mexico.

2018 World Cup Roster

2016 World Cup Roster

2014 World Cup Roster 
Pitchers
 Kim McMillan
 Melinda Latimer
 Stephanie Gaynor
 Brittany Hepburn
 Maddison Lenard
 Lauren McGrath
 Laura Neads
 Jacinda Barclay
 Georgia Blair
 Taylah Welch
 Amy Collins
Outfield
 Amy McCann
 Leigh Godfrey
 Rachael Higgins
Infield
 Shae Lillywhite
 Christina Kreppold
 Natalie Rawlings
 Bronwyn Gell
 Katie Gaynor
Catcher
 Tahnee Lovering

2012 World Cup Roster

2010 World Cup Roster

Coaching staff
Head Coach – Simone Wearne
Assistant Coach – Dean White
Assistant Coach – Narelle Gosstray
Assistant Coach – Luke Hughes
Pitching Coach – Graeme Lloyd
Physio – Jonni Ralph
Executive Officer – David Nagy
Technical Analyst – Yasunori Sato

World ranking 

In August 2009 the International Baseball Federation created a ranking system so that the nations involved in international competition could be compared independently. Teams receive points based on the position they finish at the end of World Cup tournaments. Only results at the previous three tournaments years are used, so points are added and removed over time. Points are also weighted so that more recent tournaments have a greater impact on the rankings. Since the rankings were introduced, two editions have been released, the most recent released after the 2010 World Cup.

When the rankings were first introduced, Australia was listed at 4th position; their lowest since the rankings were introduced. Their best position achieved to date is their current position of 3rd.

 * – When the rankings were first released, the 2008 World Cup was the most recent tournament completed that had any bearing on the rankings themselves.

Women's World Cup 

Of the twelve nations to be represented at the IBAF Women's Baseball World Cup, Australia is one of five teams to have participated in all four of them. To date its best result was in the most recent tournament held in 2010, in which Australia placed 2nd. Previously, the team had finished fourth in each of the tournaments, with medals being shared between Canada, Japan and United States.

At least one Australian has been named to each of the All-Star teams selected at the end of the respective tournaments.
 2004: Chelsea Forkin and Katie Gaynor
 2006: Simone Wearne, Shae Lillywhite and Amy McCann
 2008: Angela Catford
 2010: Laura Neads, Christina Kreppold and Kim McMillan
 2016: Tahnee Lovering, Tammy McMillan

See also
Women's baseball in Australia

References

External links 
 Emeralds Official Site 

 
National
Women's national baseball teams
Women's baseball teams in Australia